Mikulin-Parcela  is a village in the administrative district of Gmina Jeżów, within Brzeziny County, Łódź Voivodeship, in central Poland.

The village has a population of 32.

References

Mikulin-Parcela